The 2001–02 NBA season was the 32nd season of the National Basketball Association in Cleveland, Ohio. For the third consecutive year, the Cavaliers had the eighth pick in the 2001 NBA draft, and selected high school center DeSagana Diop. During the off-season, the team re-acquired former Cavs forward Tyrone Hill and Jumaine Jones from the Philadelphia 76ers, acquired Ricky Davis from the Miami Heat, and signed free agent Bryant Stith. Under new head coach John Lucas, the Cavaliers got off to a horrible start losing nine of their first eleven games, then suffered a 12-game losing streak in January. Hill only played just 26 games due to sore back spasms, and Diop failed to live up to expectations only playing just 18 games due to knee, ankle and foot injuries. The Cavs lost 50 games for the third straight season, finishing 7th in the Central Division with a 29–53 record.

Lamond Murray was the team's leading scorer averaging 16.6 points per game, and Andre Miller averaged a double-double in points and assists, averaging 16.5 points and leading the league with 10.9 assists per game. Following the season, Murray was traded to the Toronto Raptors, while Miller was traded along with Stith to the Los Angeles Clippers, and Wesley Person was dealt to the Memphis Grizzlies.

Key Dates:

Offseason

Free agents

Trades

Draft picks

*1st round pick acquired from Miami in Shawn Kemp three-way deal with Portland. Haywood traded to Orlando in Michael Doleac deal.

Roster

Regular season

Season standings

Record vs. opponents

Game log

|-style="background:#fcc;"
| 16 || November 29, 2001 || Atlanta
| L 96–105
|
|
|
| Gund Arena11,201
| 5–11

|-style="background:#fcc;"
| 58 || March 2, 2002 || @ Atlanta
| L 81–84
|
|
|
| Philips Arena15,878
| 21–37
|-style="background:#cfc;"
| 60 || March 5, 2002 || Atlanta
| W 103–96
|
|
|
| Gund Arena9,915
| 22–38

|-style="background:#fcc;"
| 80 || April 13, 2002 || @ Atlanta
| L 123–128 (2 OT)
|
|
|
| Philips Arena15,282
| 29–51

Player stats

Regular season

Player Statistics Citation:

Awards and records

Records

Milestones

All-Star

Transactions

Trades

Free agents

Development League

References

 Cleveland Cavaliers on Database Basketball
 Cleveland Cavaliers on Basketball Reference

Cleveland Cavaliers seasons
Cleve
Cleve